The Wudjari were an Aboriginal Australian people of the Noongar cultural group of the southern region of Western Australia.

Country
The inland extension was to about 30 miles. Kent, Ravensthorpe, Fanny Cove, Esperance, and Cape Arid all have been developed over the old Wudjari lands.

Early history
There was a western/eastern divide among the Wudjari bands. At the earliest point of contact with white explorers, it was noted that the western divisions were on the move, shifting towards Bremer Bay. The groups to the east of Fanny Cove and the Young River, on the other hand, had adopted circumcision as part of their tribal initiatory rites, a transformation that earned them the name of Bardonjunga/Bardok among those Wudjari who refused to absorb the practice. This customary scission, according to Norman Tindale, perhaps marked the inchoate genesis of a new tribal identity among the easterners, who had also adopted a differential ethnonym for themselves; Nyunga. These Wudjari Njunga contested the terrain between Mount Ragged and Israelite Bay with the Ngadjunmaia.

Curiosity
In 1855 an edited account was published of a shipwrecked castaway, called William Jackman, purporting to relate 18 months of captivity among Australian cannibal tribes somewhere on the Great Australian Bight. The story proved very popular, and the narrative seen as fascinating, but suspicions have long existed as to its authenticity. In 2002, the historian Martin Gibbs analysed both the book and its historical background and context, and concluded that some elements certainly bore traces of familiarity with the Nyungar cultural block. In particular he conjectured that parts of the tale might well reflect experience of living among the Wudjari, or Nyunga, or even the Ngadjunmaia.

Alternative names

 ?Daran (Perth exonym for eastern tribes seeing the sun emerge from the sea)
 Karkar (A Wiiman exonym meaning "east")
 Kwaitjman (of northern tribes)
 Ngokgurring
 Ngokwurring
 Njungar, Nyungar
 Njungura (A Mimeng informant's exonym)
 Nonga.
 Nunga
 Warangu 
 Widjara
 Wuda
 Wudja
 Wudjarima
 Yunga/Yungar ([tribal name of the Bremer Bay tribe, where a group of Wudjari shifted, into territory not originally theirs)

Source:

Some words
 kooning. (baby)
 kun. (mother)
 mann. (father)
 mookine. (wild dog)
 twart (tame dog)

Source:

Notes

Citations

Sources

Aboriginal peoples of Western Australia
Extinct ethnic groups
Great Southern (Western Australia)